Frances Wasserlein (b. June 19, 1946 San Francisco – August 23, 2015 Halfmoon Bay) was an American arts community manager and a LBTQ rights activist residing in Canada. She was executive producer of Vancouver Folk Music Festival and box office manager of other festivals and centers in the Vancouver area. She was a board member of a British Columbia Arts Council predecessor from 1996 to 2002.

Life 
Wasserlein was born in San Francisco but brought up in Vancouver in Canada. 

She received a BA in history from University of British Columbia in 1980, after which she received a Master of Arts in history at Simon Fraser University.

In 1970 she led the Abortion Caravan from Vancouver to Ottawa, and in 1982 she co-founded Women Against Violence Against Women (WAVAW/Rape Relief).

She moved to Halfmoon Bay, British Columbia after marrying Marguerite Kotwitz in 2003. There, she was executive director of Sunshine Coast Community Arts Council from 2008 to 2013 and taught cultural event management at Capilano College.

She died at home in Halfmoon Bay, British Columbia on August 23, 2015.

References

Further reading
 
 

1946 births
2015 deaths
Academic staff of Capilano University
Canadian LGBT rights activists
American LGBT rights activists
People from San Francisco
Simon Fraser University alumni
University of British Columbia alumni